The Seattle Mariners are an American professional baseball team based in Seattle. They compete in Major League Baseball (MLB) as a member club of the American League (AL) West division. The team joined the American League as an expansion team in 1977 playing their home games in the Kingdome. Since July , the Mariners' home ballpark has been T-Mobile Park, located in the SoDo neighborhood of Seattle.

The "Mariners" name originates from the prominence of marine culture in the city of Seattle. They are nicknamed the M's, a title featured in their primary logo from 1987 to 1992. They adopted their current team colors – navy blue, northwest green (teal), and silver – prior to the 1993 season, after having been royal blue and gold since the team's inception. Their mascot is the Mariner Moose.

The franchise did not field a winning team until 1991 and further success eluded them until  when they won their first division championship and defeated the New York Yankees in the ALDS. The game-winning hit in Game 5, in which Edgar Martínez drove home Ken Griffey Jr. to win the game in the 11th inning, clinched a series win for the Mariners, served as a powerful impetus to preserve baseball in Seattle, and has since become an iconic moment in team history.

The Mariners won 116 games in 2001, which set the American League record for most wins in a single season and tied the 1906 Chicago Cubs for the Major League record for most wins in a single season. The team would not make the postseason again until 2022, which was the longest active drought in the four major North American sports.

As of 2022, the franchise has finished with a losing record in 30 of 46 seasons. The Mariners are the only active MLB franchise never to have appeared in the World Series, and currently hold the longest active World Series appearance drought in MLB. 

, the Mariners' all-time win–loss record is 3,402–3,783.

History

The Mariners were created as a result of a lawsuit. In , in the aftermath of the Seattle Pilots' purchase and relocation to Milwaukee as the Milwaukee Brewers by Bud Selig, the city of Seattle, King County, and the state of Washington (represented by then-state Attorney General and future U.S. Senator Slade Gorton) sued the American League for breach of contract.  Confident that Major League Baseball would return to Seattle within a few years, King County built the multi-purpose Kingdome, which would become home to the National Football League's expansion Seattle Seahawks in 1976. The name "Mariners" was chosen by club officials in August 1976 from over 600 names submitted by 15,000 entrants in a name-the-team contest.

The first home run in team history was hit on April 10, 1977, by designated hitter Juan Bernhardt.

That year, star pitcher Diego Seguí, in his last major league season, became the only player to play for both the Pilots and the Mariners. The Mariners finished with a 64–98 record, echoing the record the 1969 Pilots once held; however, the team was able to avoid last place in the AL West by half a game. In 1979, Seattle hosted the 50th Major League Baseball All-Star Game. After the 1981 season, the Mariners were sold to California businessman George Argyros, who in turn sold the team to Jeff Smulyan in 1989, and then to Nintendo of America in 1992.

During the 1992–93 offseason, the Mariners hired manager Lou Piniella, who had led the Cincinnati Reds to victory in the 1990 World Series. Mariner fans embraced Piniella, and he would helm the team from  through , winning two American League Manager of the Year Awards along the way. Piniella also had the distinction of being selected by the Seattle Pilots in the 1968 expansion draft and being on their roster from November 1968 to April 1969 when he was traded to the Kansas City Royals, where he earned rookie of the Year honors for 1969.

The  Mariners club finished with a record of 116–46, leading all of Major League Baseball in winning percentage for the duration of the season and easily winning the American League West division championship. In doing so, the team broke the 1998 Yankees American League single-season record of 114 wins and matched the all-time MLB single-season record for wins set by the  Chicago Cubs. At the end of the season, Ichiro Suzuki won the AL MVP, AL Rookie of the Year, and one of three outfield Gold Glove Awards, becoming the first player since the  Boston Red Sox's Fred Lynn to win all three in the same season. The celebration wouldn't last, however, as the Mariners lost to the New York Yankees in the 2001 ALCS.

On October 22,  the Mariners announced the hiring of Jack Zduriencik, formerly scouting director of the Milwaukee Brewers, as their general manager. Weeks later, on November 18, the team named Oakland Athletics bench coach Don Wakamatsu as its new field manager.  Wakamatsu and Zduriencik hired an entirely new coaching staff for 2009, which included former World Series MVP John Wetteland as bullpen coach. The off-season also saw a litany of roster moves, headlined by a 12-player, 3-team trade that included sending All-Star closer J. J. Putz to the New York Mets and brought 5 players—including prospect Mike Carp and outfielder Endy Chávez from New York and outfielder Franklin Gutiérrez from the Cleveland Indians—to Seattle. Many of the moves, like the free-agent signing of Mike Sweeney, were made in part with the hope of squelching the clubhouse infighting that plagued the Mariners in 2008. It also saw the return of Seattle favorite Griffey Jr. The 2009–10 offseason was highlighted by the trade for 2008 American League Cy Young Award winner Cliff Lee from the Philadelphia Phillies, the signing of third baseman Chone Figgins and the contract extension of star pitcher "King" Félix Hernández.

Griffey Jr. announced his retirement on June 2, 2010, after 22 MLB seasons.

The Mariners fired field manager Don Wakamatsu along with bench coach Ty Van Burkleo, pitching coach Rick Adair and performance coach Steve Hecht on August 9, 2010. Daren Brown, the manager of the AAA affiliate Tacoma Rainiers, took over as interim field manager. Roger Hansen, the former Minor League catching coordinator, was promoted to bench coach. Carl Willis, the former Minor League pitching coordinator, was promoted to pitching coach.

The Mariners hired former Cleveland Indians manager Eric Wedge as their new manager on October 19, 2010.

Dave Niehaus, the Mariners' play-by-play announcer since the team's inception, died of a heart attack on November 10, 2010, at the age of 75. In memory of Niehaus, Seattle rapper Macklemore wrote a tribute song called "My Oh My" in December 2010. He performed the song at the Mariners' Opening Day game on April 8, .

On April 21, 2012, Philip Humber of the Chicago White Sox threw the third perfect game in Chicago White Sox history against the Mariners at Safeco Field in Seattle. It was the 21st perfect game in MLB history. Mariners starting pitcher Kevin Millwood and five other pitchers combined to throw the tenth combined no-hitter in MLB history and the first in team history on June 8, 2012. The last combined one occurred in 2003, when six Houston Astros no-hit the New York Yankees in New York. The six pitchers used in a no-hitter is a major league record. Félix Hernández pitched the first perfect game in team history, shutting down the Tampa Bay Rays 1–0 at Safeco Field on August 15, 2012. It was the 23rd perfect game in Major League Baseball history. The Mariners became the first team in Major League Baseball to be involved in two perfect games in one season.

General Manager (GM) Jack Zduriencik was relieved of his position by the team on August 28, 2015. Jerry Dipoto, who formerly served as GM of the Los Angeles Angels of Anaheim, was hired as the new GM of the Mariners one month later. On October 9, 2015, manager Lloyd McClendon was fired, and the search for a new manager was begun. Scott Servais was named the new Mariners' manager on October 23, 2015.

Nintendo of America issued a press release on April 27, 2016, stating it would sell most shares it held of Seattle Mariners ownership to First Avenue Entertainment limited partnership. Nintendo retained a 10% ownership share of the team after the sale was completed in August 2016.

Uniforms

1977–1980

The Mariners' original colors were blue and gold, the color scheme previously used by the Seattle Pilots and its successor Milwaukee Brewers. For the first four seasons, they wore white pullover jerseys at home with the team name in front and numbers on the left chest. The "M" in "Mariners" was shaped to resemble a trident. On the road, they wore baby blue pullover jerseys with the city name in front and numbers on the left chest. The lettering colors were blue with gold trim, though in the 1977 season the trim on the road jersey was white and the "Seattle" wordmark appeared smaller. The trident logo was added to the left sleeve prior to the 1979 season.

The cap was all-blue and featured the gold trident logo with white trim.

1981–1986
The Mariners made some subtle changes to the uniform in 1981. The trident logo was replaced by blue and gold racing stripes on the shoulders, and the lettering received an extra blue outline. The number font also changed from rounded to block style. In 1985, the road jersey color was changed to grey.

The cap logo also featured a slight update of the trident logo, changing its color to blue, along with additional outlines and a white star background.

1987–1992

In 1987, the Mariners changed its uniform style to traditional buttoned tops and belted pants. Both uniforms incorporated blue piping and a block "Mariners" wordmark in blue with gold and blue outlines. The numbers remained blue, but eliminated the trim outlines.

The cap logo was changed to a gold "S".

1993–present
The white home uniform originally featured "Mariners" in navy with Northwest Green trim and featured the "compass" logo atop the "M". The grey road uniform originally featured "Seattle" in navy with Northwest Green and white trim; in 2001, the "compass" logo was added in the middle of the "S". In 2015, a silver inline was added to the wordmark of both uniforms, which was also applied to the block letters and numbers. The primary logo is applied to the left sleeve.

From 1997 to 2000, the Mariners also wore sleeveless versions of their primary uniforms, accompanied with a navy undershirt.

The Mariners have also worn Northwest Green alternate uniforms at some points in their history. The original version was unveiled in 1994 and had "Mariners" in silver with navy and white trim. The next season, the white trim was removed to improve visibility. The Mariners did not wear these uniforms from 1997 to 2010, after which it became a regular part of their uniform rotation. It is currently seen during Friday home games.

The navy alternate uniform originally replaced the Northwest Green alternate in 1997 and featured the team name in silver with Northwest Green and navy trim. In 1999, the alternates were updated to feature the city name with the "S" behind the "compass" logo and silver piping; this became their road alternate the following season after a corresponding home navy alternate was introduced. In 2003, the silver piping was removed and the letter and number fonts were changed to match the wordmark. In 2012, after the Northwest Green home alternates were brought back, the navy uniforms were tweaked anew, this time with the city name in front and stylized serifed letters instead of the normal block letters. It is now worn on most road games, though they have also donned them at home on occasion.

A navy blue cap that features a ball and compass "S" logo is paired with the home white, road gray, and navy blue jerseys. A variation of this cap with a Northwest Green brim is worn with the home alternate jersey. The Mariners also wore Northwest Green caps with navy brims, but only in the 1994 season, and a navy "compass" cap with grey brims in the 1997 season.

In January 2015, the team announced a new alternate uniform to be worn for Sunday home games. This cream-colored "fauxback" uniform features the current logo and lettering style in a royal blue and gold color scheme, a throwback to the original team colors. Unlike the rest of the uniform set, the back of the jersey does not display the player name. The cap features the current cap logo in the throwback colors.

In January 2019, the Mariners announced a new home and away uniform to be worn during spring training. The jersey has a design similar to their home white jerseys but features a powder blue throwback to the team colors during the 1980s. The cap has the usual navy blue color, but with a logo that features the signature compass rose and with a large M in the center.

For the 2023 season, MLB and Nike have instituted a "four plus one" model for team uniforms, consisting of a home uniform, away uniform, two alternate uniforms, and a "City Connect" uniform featuring "color schemes and logos that pay homage to a team’s city." The Mariners confirmed that they will replace the gray jerseys with the navy blue jerseys as their standard away uniforms for the 2023 season. The team will also stop using the powder blue jerseys during spring training. They are expected to unveil a City Connect uniform in either the 2023 or the 2024 season. The choice to remove the gray and powder blue jerseys was based on feedback from players and fans, according to Kevin Martinez, the Mariners senior vice president of marketing and communications.

Spring training
The Peoria Sports Complex in Peoria, Arizona, has been the Mariners' home spring training facility since 1994. The complex is shared with the San Diego Padres. On March 25, 2013, in a 16–0 victory over the Cincinnati Reds, the Mariners broke the team record for total home runs during a spring training season with 52.

Season records
This is a partial list listing the past 21 completed regular seasons. For the full season records, see here.

T-Mobile Park
T-Mobile Park (known as Safeco Field from 1999 to 2018) has been home to the Seattle Mariners since the first game vs. the San Diego Padres on July 15, 1999. There were 44,607 people in attendance that night.

Seattle Mariners Hall of Fame

Seattle Mariners former chairman and CEO John Ellis announced on June 14, 1997, the creation of a Mariners Hall of Fame. It is operated by the Seattle Mariners organization. It honors the players, staff and other individuals that greatly contributed to the history and success of the Mariners franchise. It is located at the Baseball Museum of the Pacific Northwest in T-Mobile Park.  The most recent Mariners Hall of Fame member, Ichiro Suzuki was inducted August 27 2022.

Retired numbers

The Mariners plan to retire uniform numbers only very selectively and subject to substantially higher expectations than those applied to the Mariners' Hall of Fame. To be eligible to have one's number retired, in addition to the criteria outlined for the Mariners' Hall of Fame, the former Mariners should have either:      a) been elected to the National Baseball Hall of Fame and been in a Mariner's uniform for at least five years, or       b) come close to such election and have spent substantially his entire career with the Mariners. Eligibility shall not commence until after the former player has been voted on once for the National Baseball Hall of Fame, which for all practical purposes means six years after retirement.

Ken Griffey Jr.'s No. 24 was retired at the beginning of the 2016 season, with the retirement ceremony taking place on August 6, 2016. Griffey had been elected to the Hall of Fame in January of that year.

Edgar Martínez's No. 11 was retired during the 2017 season, with the retirement ceremony taking place on August 12, 2017. His No. 11 was retired in 2017, predating his 2019 election to the Hall of Fame and seemingly establishing the 58.6% of the vote he received that year as sufficiently "close" to election to satisfy the club's bylaws. Jersey No. 11 was not issued to anyone else between Martínez's retirement as a player in 2004 until his return to the Mariners as hitting coach in 2015.

Currently, only one other player has definitively met the requirements to have his number retired: Randy Johnson, who played 10 seasons with the Mariners (1989–1998) and was elected to the Hall of Fame in 2015.

Despite not officially retiring No. 19, the team has not reissued it since Jay Buhner left the team in 2001.

Number 51 (Randy Johnson) was withheld from players from 1998 until 2001, when it was issued to Ichiro Suzuki upon his request after wearing it for his entire career in Japan. It was presumably taken out of circulation again, following Ichiro's 2012 trade to the Yankees coupled with Johnson's 2015 election into the Baseball Hall of Fame. The number was once again worn by Ichiro upon his return to the Mariners in 2018, until retiring in 2019. On April 15, 2022, Ichiro threw out the ceremonial first pitch before the first home game of the 2022 season, wearing his No. 51 jersey.

Number 14 (Lou Piniella) was not given to any uniformed personnel between Piniella's 2002 departure and 2015, but it was issued to third-base coach Manny Acta for the 2016 season. Piniella has been on the ballot for the Hall of Fame twice (2016, 2018), and he was one vote short in the latter ballot from being inducted.

Jackie Robinson's No. 42 was retired throughout Major League Baseball on April 15, 1997.

No. 00 is presumed off-limits, as it has been worn by the Mariner Moose since 1997 (outfielder Jeffrey Leonard was the last player to wear 00 for the M's, in 1990). From 1990 to 1996, the Moose wore the last two digits of the year of the current season.

Culture

"Louie Louie"
From the 1990 season through the 2021 season, as part of the seventh-inning stretch, after the crowd was led in singing "Take Me Out To The Ball Game" or "God Bless America" the public address system played the Kingsmen's version of "Louie Louie". The song was a regional hit in the Northwest, covered by many local bands for nearly a decade until the Portland-based Kingsmen recorded their version in 1963. In 1985, the song's regional importance was publicized by a campaign to make it the official state song of Washington. The tradition to play the song during the seventh inning stretch began as an attempt for the then new ownership group to put its stamp on the team, and was solidified on June 2, 1990, when the Kingsmen performed the song in the middle of the seventh inning live from atop a dugout. That game, Randy Johnson threw the first no-hitter in Mariners history.

For the 2022 season, the Mariners replaced Louie Louie with the Macklemore & Ryan Lewis song "Can't Hold Us". The elimination of the traditional "Louie Louie" has been a source of contention amongst some across the northwest, according to local news media.

Buhner Buzz Cut Night
In 1994, the Mariners started a promotion called "Buhner Buzz Cut Night" Inspired by Jay Buhner's shaved head; any fan who was willing to have their head shaved before the game—or was already bald—would receive a free ticket to the game and a T-shirt with a slogan such as "Bald is Buhnerful" or "Take Me Out To The Bald Game". Hair 10 inches or longer was collected for charity. The promotion continued until Buhner's retirement in 2001, with a year's hiatus in 2000, and is still remembered by fans today.

Rally Fries

Rally Fries are a baseball tradition started by Mariners broadcaster Mike Blowers in 2007. During a game against the Cincinnati Reds, a fan tried to catch a foul ball along the right-field line but in turn spilled his tray of french fries along the track. While chatting on the air and seeing the mishap, Blowers' partner, Dave Sims, suggested that he should send a new tray of fries to the fan. Blowers agreed, and sent his intern to deliver a plate of fries to the man.

At the Mariners' next game, fans made signs and boards asking Blowers for fries as well. Coincidentally, every time the fries were delivered, the Mariners seem to score or rally from a deficit, and thus the "Rally Fries" were created. This became so popular with the fans that signs were even seen when the Mariners were the visiting team, although on August 1, 2009, Blowers established that he only gives out fries at home games.

Generally, Blowers would select a person or a group of people that appealed to him, whether it was through fans wearing elaborate costumes or waving funny signs and boards. The fries were usually delivered from Ivar's, a Seattle-based seafood restaurant with a location at T-Mobile Park. The amount of fries given out varied with the size of the winning group of fans. The winners were generally selected around the 5th or 6th inning, although potential candidates were shown in almost every inning beforehand.

Previous fan sections

Area 51
During the years Ichiro Suzuki played right field for the Mariners, seats in right field were often informally called Area 51, a nod to Ichiro's uniform number (51) and to the top-secret government site in Nevada of the same name. It was the first attempt by Mariners fans to create a dedicated fan section.

King's Court
As the 2011 season progressed, the Mariners' marketing staff came up with an idea to encourage the growing fanbase of star pitcher "King" Félix Hernández. Every Hernandez start at T-Mobile Park was accompanied by the King's Court, a designated cheering section for fans to sing, chant, and cheer while donning yellow T-shirts and "K" cards that are supplied by the team. It was located in the lower seating area along the 3rd baseline which would regularly see left-handed hitters (which teams would field more of when facing the right-handed Hernandez) hit foul balls into more so than most other areas of the field, meaning the section would be on camera catching foul balls often.

The King's Court was both a personal rooting section for Hernandez and trendsetter for T-Mobile Park. The team encouraged fans to dress like Larry Bernandez, Hernandez's alter ego from a Mariners TV commercial, or show up in wacky costumes, rewarding the best with a ceremonial turkey leg.

The Supreme Court was a special event where the King's Court section was extended to the entirety of T-Mobile Park. The first Supreme Court was Hernandez's first home game following his perfect game in 2012. Following opening day 2012, it occurred each year at Hernandez's first home game of each season.

Following Hernandez's departure from the Mariners at the end of the 2019 season, the King's Court is now officially retired.

Maple Grove
The ultimately disappointing 2017 season had a few bright spots, including the establishment of the Maple Grove, a celebration of Canadian pitcher James Paxton and inspired by the King's Court. At home games where Paxton started, a group of fans sat under a Maple Grove banner, typically in the left-field bleachers. A potted maple tree was also present in their section, provided by the Mariners; the Grove dubbed the tree "Stick Rizzs", in honor of long-time Mariner broadcaster Rick Rizzs. The live tree was retired in 2018, replaced by a hardier fake tree.

When Paxton got to two strikes on a batter, the Grove held up “Eh” Cards, a tip of the cap to Paxton's home country of Canada and a nod to the "K" (for strikeout) cards held up in King's Court. Variant cards have also been produced for special occasions, such as when a planned Paxton start turned into a Hernández start (a King's Grove, with "K'eh" cards to cheer for Hernández). Other special cards celebrated Paxton reaching 300 strikeouts, and a tribute to broadcaster Angie Mentink ("A" cards, to show support after she had publicly disclosed her breast cancer diagnosis). An "Eh" card now resides in the National Baseball Hall of Fame and Museum collection.

The Maple Grove differed from the King's Court in that it was created and organized by fans, while the Court was promoted by the Mariners' marketing team. When asked, Paxton stated that fans creating the Maple Grove was really special to him and that he never imagined that something of the sort would ever be done for him. The Grove continued until Paxton was traded to the Yankees following the 2018 season.

French Quarter in Seattle/JROD Squad 

Replacing these are two newer fan sections:

The French Quarter 
The French Quarter (not to be confused with the similarly named fan section of the Philadelphia Phillies named in honor of team starter Aaron Nola and his roots in the state of Louisiana) honors first baseman Ty France. It is located on a section of the Upper Concourse above "The Pen" and "Edgar's at T-Mobile Park." Inaugurated by the fans with the blessing of the Mariners organization in 2021, it is the first ever to be dedicated to a Mariners position player and the first for an MLB infielder in any MLB team. Ty's fans stationed in this section wear black berets and carry French tricolore flags in a nod to his name during home games beginning in the 2022 season. The section also sports a French flag.

JROD Squad/No Fly Zone 
Similarly, The JROD Squad honors Mariners star center fielder Julio Rodriguez. The location varies, although it is usually in seats in center field. Fans buying tickets to the JROD Squad section (referred to collectively as JROD's Squad) receive a T-shirt showing a replica of a gold chain Rodriguez wears around his neck. Rodriguez often interacts with the JROD Squad, waving to them and throwing them balls at the end of innings. Also a result of the 2022 season campaign, it is the 3rd overall position player fan section in the MLB (2nd overall for an outfielder).

Players

Roster

Baseball Hall of Famers
The following elected members of the Baseball Hall of Fame spent part of their careers with the Mariners.

Ford C. Frick Award recipients

State of Washington Sports Hall of Fame

Minor league affiliations

The Seattle Mariners farm system consists of six minor league affiliates.

Radio and television

The Mariners' flagship radio station is KIRO-AM (710 ESPN Radio), which previously broadcast Mariners contests from 1985 to 2002.  Former flagship stations include KOMO (2003–2008), and KVI-AM 570 (1977–1984). Television rights are held by Root Sports Northwest. During the 2016 season, the Mariners averaged a 5.84 rating and 103,000 viewers on primetime TV broadcasts. In years past, Mariners games have also appeared in Seattle on over-the-air stations KING-TV, KIRO-TV, KTZZ-TV (now KZJO), and KSTW.  Selected Mariners games are also available on Canadian television, due to an agreement between Root Sports Northwest and Rogers Sportsnet Pacific.

Since 2013, Rick Rizzs and Aaron Goldsmith have called games on the radio. The television broadcasts are anchored by play-by-play announcer Dave Sims and color commentator (and former Mariners player) Mike Blowers. Seattle radio personality Matt Pitman hosts the post-game show on the Mariners' radio network, along with clubhouse reporter Shannon Drayer.  Spanish-language radio broadcast duties are handled by Alex Rivera.

The Mariners' broadcast team for 2010 featured Dave Niehaus and Rizzs—back for their 32nd and 23rd seasons with the club, respectively—as well as Sims and Blowers. For the first three innings of each game, Niehaus worked the television broadcast with Blowers while Rizzs and Sims handled radio duties; after the third inning, Niehaus and Sims traded places. Niehaus, who had broadcast for the Mariners since their inaugural season of 1977, died on November 10, 2010.  For the 2011 season, Dave Niehaus' duties in the broadcast booth were filled by a collection of former Mariners broadcasters such as Ron Fairly, Ken Levine, and Ken Wilson; and former Mariners' players such as Dave Valle, Dan Wilson, Jay Buhner, and Dave Henderson.

Tom Hutyler has been the Mariners' public address announcer since 1987, first at the Kingdome, and presently at T-Mobile Park.  While KOMO 1000 AM was the Mariners' flagship radio station, Hutyler occasionally hosted the post-game radio show.

Franchise records and award winners

Season records
 Highest Batting Average: .372, Ichiro Suzuki (2004)
 Most Runs: 141, Alex Rodriguez (1996)
 Most Hits: 262, Ichiro Suzuki (2004) (Major League Record)
 Highest Slugging %: .674, Ken Griffey Jr. (1994)
 Highest On-Base %: .479, Edgar Martínez (1995)
 Highest On-Base Plus Slugging: 1.107, Edgar Martínez (1995)
 Most Doubles: 54, Alex Rodriguez (1996)
 Most Triples: 12, Ichiro Suzuki (2005)
 Most Home Runs: 56, Ken Griffey Jr. (1997, 1998)
 Most Grand Slams: 4, Edgar Martínez (2000)
 Most RBIs: 147, Ken Griffey Jr. (1997)
 Most Stolen Bases: 60, Harold Reynolds (1987)
 Most Wins: 21, Jamie Moyer (2003)
 Lowest ERA: 2.14, Félix Hernández (2014)
 Most Strikeouts: 308, Randy Johnson (1993)
 Most Complete Games: 14, Mike Moore (1985) and Mark Langston (1987)
 Most Saves: 57, Edwin Diaz (2018)

Career records
 Most Home Runs: 417, Ken Griffey Jr.
 Most RBIs: 1261, Edgar Martínez
 Most Runs: 1219, Edgar Martínez
 Most Walks: 1283, Edgar Martínez
 Most Hits: 2542, Ichiro Suzuki
 Most Stolen Bases: 438, Ichiro Suzuki
 Highest Average: .322, Ichiro Suzuki
 Highest Slugging %: .561, Alex Rodriguez
 Highest On Base %: .418, Edgar Martínez
 Highest OPS: .934, Alex Rodriguez
 Most Games Played: 2055, Edgar Martínez
 Lowest ERA: 3.01, Tom Wilhelmsen
 Lowest WHIP: 1.14, Hisashi Iwakuma
 Most Innings Pitched: 2658, Félix Hernández
 Most Wins: 168, Félix Hernández
 Most Strikeouts: 2467, Félix Hernández
 Most Saves: 129, Kazuhiro Sasaki

See also

 1977 Major League Baseball expansion
 1995 American League West tie-breaker game
 2001 Major League Baseball All-Star Game
 The Double (Seattle Mariners)
 Rick Kaminski
 Edward "Tuba Man" McMichael
 Seattle Rainiers
 Sports in Seattle

Footnotes

External links

 

 
Baseball teams established in 1977
1977 establishments in Washington (state)
Major League Baseball teams
Cactus League
Baseball in Seattle